Christopher john Elstub (born 3rd feb 1981)  in Dewsbury, West Yorkshire, England) is an English first-class cricketer, who played six matches for Yorkshire County Cricket Club between 2000 and 2002, as a right-handed lower order batsman and right arm medium pacer.  He scored a total of 28 runs, with his best an unbeaten 18, and with six not outs in seven innings, his average was quite high for a lower order batsman at 28.00 rpi (runs per innings.) He took nine  wickets at 39.55 with a best of 3 for 37, plus two catches.  In ten one day matches for Yorkshire and the Leeds/Bradford UCCE, he took 12 wickets at 24.16, with 4 for 25 his best performance.

After being released by Yorkshire, he played one Second XI game for Kent County Cricket Club in 2003, without taking a miss.

He is now a secondary school PE teacher in Cleckheaton, West Yorkshire at whitcliffemount.

References

External links
Cricinfo Profile
Cricket Archive Statistics

1981 births
Yorkshire cricketers
Cricketers from Dewsbury
Living people
English cricketers
Yorkshire Cricket Board cricketers
English cricketers of 1969 to 2000
English cricketers of the 21st century